Emerse Faé (born 24 January 1984) is a former professional footballer who played as a midfielder. Born in France, he represented the Ivory Coast at international level.

Club career

Youth career
Born in Nantes, Faé started his youth career with USSA Vertou, before moving to FC Nantes in 1999.

Nantes
Faé's senior career started in 2003 with his home town club, Nantes, who were then in Ligue 1. He made his European debut on 26 July 2003, in a 3–2 loss in the third round of the UEFA Intertoto Cup. In August 2003, he debuted in Ligue 1, in a 0–0 draw against Bordeaux. In the Coupe de la Ligue Final 2004, he started for Nantes, which eventually lost on penalties. He went on to play over 100 league games for them. On 9 May 2007, Nantes was relegated from Ligue 1 and he handed in a transfer request.

Reading
During the summer 2007 transfer window, Faé was strongly linked with a move to Premier League club Reading, and eventually completed a £2.5m move on 2 August 2007, signing a three-year contract, with the option of a fourth. He was given the number 20 shirt. He made his Premier League debut for Reading as a makeshift right midfielder in the 3–0 defeat at Bolton Wanderers on 25 August 2007.

Faé contracted malaria while on Africa Cup of Nations duty, and fell ill in the buildup to Reading's match away to Middlesbrough on 1 March 2008. He flew back south for medical treatment and had blood tests on 2 March, which revealed the disease.

After failing to break into the Reading first team, Faé refused to play for the reserve team against Tottenham Hotspur reserves along with Ibrahima Sonko. Both were fined two weeks wages and suspended for two weeks and therefore missed the last two league games of the season, which ended with Reading being relegated.

Faé then flew back to France with both Steve Coppell and said that he would never play for Reading again.

During his time with Reading, he started six games only.

Nice
In June 2008, he was loaned to Ligue 1 side OGC Nice, with a view to a permanent transfer. He made his debut for his new club on 9 August, in a 1–0 defeat to Le Havre, and on 20 September, he scored his first goal in a 2–2 draw against Le Mans FC.

On 29 January 2009, it was confirmed that Faé had completed a permanent move to Nice for an undisclosed fee.

On 18 October 2009, Faé was sent off with a second yellow card, after he directed abusive language towards the referee in a 4–1 loss against Lorient. He was suspended for three matches by the league. Nice also promised to discipline him internally.

On 1 February 2012, Faé announced his retirement from football at age 28, due to ongoing problems with phlebitis.

International career
As a teenager, Faé played football for the French U17 and U21 teams. He debuted for the French U17 team in an 8–0 win over Liechtenstein on 26 February 2001, and was in the team that won the 2001 FIFA U-17 World Championship in Trinidad and Tobago.

However, in 2005, following a FIFA rule change concerning national team eligibility, Faé switched allegiances from France to Ivory Coast, the country from which his parents had come. He received his first call up to the Ivory Coast national team for a World Cup qualifier against Benin on 27 March 2005. He made his debut in the 3–0 win.

Faé scored his first goal for the Ivory Coast in a 1–1 draw against Switzerland on 27 May 2006, when he fired in a 30-yard shot, two minutes after coming on.

Faé went on to play at the 2006 African Cup of Nations, appearing at every match for a total of 452 minutes. He also played for the country in the 2006 FIFA World Cup. He was called up to the Ivory Coast 23-man squad for the 2008 Africa Cup of Nations, and made his first appearance at the tournament in the Elephants' 3–0 victory over Mali on 29 January 2008. He was also selected for the 2010 African Cup of Nations, in which he appeared twice as a substitute.

Faé was also selected in the preliminary Ivory Coast squad for the 2010 FIFA World Cup, but was eventually dropped along with Bakari Koné and Gilles Yapi Yapo, who played with him in the 2006 World Cup.

Career statistics

Club

International

Scores and results list Ivory Coast's goal tally first, score column indicates score after each Faé goal.

Honors
Ivory Coast
Africa Cup of Nations runner-up: 2006

References

External links
Emerse Faé profile at readingfc.co.uk

Emerse Faé profile at worldcup365.com

1984 births
Living people
Footballers from Nantes
Citizens of Ivory Coast through descent
Ivorian footballers
French footballers
Association football midfielders
Ivory Coast international footballers
France youth international footballers
France under-21 international footballers
French sportspeople of Ivorian descent
2006 FIFA World Cup players
2006 Africa Cup of Nations players
2008 Africa Cup of Nations players
2010 Africa Cup of Nations players
FC Nantes players
Ligue 1 players
Reading F.C. players
Premier League players
OGC Nice players
Ivorian expatriate footballers
French expatriate sportspeople in England
Ivorian expatriate sportspeople in England
Expatriate footballers in England
Black French sportspeople